Checkerboarding refers to a situation where land ownership is intermingled between two or more owners, resulting in a checkerboard pattern. Checkerboarding is prevalent in the Western United States and Western Canada because of extensive use in railroad grants for western expansion, although it had its beginnings in the canal land grant era.

Railroad grants

Checkerboarding in the West occurred as a result of railroad land grants where railroads would be granted every other section along a rail corridor. These grants, which typically extended  from either side of the track, were a subsidy to the railroads. Unlike per-mile subsidies which encouraged fast but shoddy track-laying, land grants encouraged higher quality work, since the railroads could increase the value of the land by building better track. The government also benefited from the increased value of the remaining public parcels.

Railroad land grants split the land surrounding the area where train tracks were to be laid into a checkerboard pattern. The land was already divided into  according to the Public Land Survey System; odd-numbered plots were given to private railroad companies, and the federal government kept even-numbered plots.

The federal government believed that because the value of land surrounding railroads would increase as much as twofold, granting land to private railroad companies would theoretically pay for itself and also increase the transportation infrastructure throughout the nation. The U.S. government was not able to sell much of the land that it retained because settlers willing to move West were not wealthy. The wealthiest United States citizens of the 19th century remained in the East. The federal government eventually gave away much of this land through the Homestead Acts.

The first grants were given to the Mobile and Ohio and Illinois Central Railroads in 1850. Additional grants were made under the Pacific Railway Acts between 1862 and 1871, when they were stopped because of public opposition.

Native Americans
Checkerboarding also occurred with Native American land grants, where native land was intermingled with non-native land. Many Native American tribes opposed checkerboarding, because it broke up traditionally communal native settlements into many individual plots and allowed non-natives to claim land within those settlements.

The Dawes Act of 1887 created the most Native American checkerboarding.

Native Americans were also negatively affected by federal government checkerboarding policies because railroad land grants were not prevented from running through land previously occupied by Native American tribes. This act of unrightful land transfer from the hands of Native Americans to private railroad companies and homestead grantees resulted in conflicts on more than one occasion. One notable location of conflict is the Chambers Checkerboard – a region occupied by Navajo people before railroad companies were granted the land to construct the transcontinental railroad. Tension grew between the Navajo tribe and the settlers of the region because of unexplained deaths, which each party blamed on the other. These tensions led to further violence after a white settler was suspected for murdering a Navajo youth without rightful punishment.

Forest management

Checkerboarding can create problems for access and ecological management. It is one of the major causes of inholdings within the boundaries of national forests. As is the case in northwestern California, checkerboarding has resulted in issues with managing national forest land. Checkerboarding was previously applied to these areas during the period of western expansion, and they are now commercial forest land. Conflicting policies establishing the rights of the private owners of this land have caused some difficulties in the local hardwood timber production economy.

While relieving this land from its checkerboard ownership structure could benefit the timber production economy of the region, checkerboards can allow government to extend good forestry practices over intermingled private lands, by demonstration or applying pressure via economy of scale or the right of access.

Land access 
Checkerboarding may make public land inaccessible when it is surrounded by privately owned land. In 2021, hunters in Wyoming were charged with trespassing on private land they never actually set foot on when they crossed between two parcels of public land at the corner where they touched. Landowners allege their airspace was violated. A jury found the hunters not guilty, but a civil lawsuit was also filed by the landowners. Corner crossing is not explicitly legal or illegal in any state, but legal opinions and enforcement differ by state.

See also
Public Land Survey System (United States)
Dominion Land Survey (Canada)
Gerrymandering
Reservation diminishment
Former Indian reservations
 Golden Checkerboard – book about the checkerboard Indian Reservation of the Agua Caliente Band of Cahuilla Indians in Palm Springs, California
Eminent domain in the United States
Homestead Acts

References

Further reading
 

Real estate in the United States
Exclaves in the United States
Enclaves in the United States
American Indian reservations
Settlement schemes in Canada
Settlement schemes in the United States